Varsity Cup is the collective name for four South African rugby union competitions involving the top rugby playing universities in the country. It was launched in 2008, with eight teams participating in the Varsity Cup competition and each university's internal champions competing in the Koshuis Rugby Championships (now known as Res Rugby). In 2011, a second tier competition called the Varsity Shield was added, increasing the number of participating universities to thirteen. A Young Guns tournament for the Under-20 side of the Varsity Cup teams was launched in 2012. A further expansion for the 2017 season saw three additional universities added to the Varsity Shield, totalling sixteen teams.

The Varsity Cup was dominated by  during the competition's formative years, with the team winning the first three tournaments in a row.

History

The Varsity Cup tournament was founded in 2008, with former Springbok World Cup winning captain, Francois Piennaar playing a key role in the establishment. At the same time, the Koshuis Rugby Championships (now known as Res Rugby) was also launched; this competition featured the university residence (koshuis) teams that won the internal league for each of the Varsity Cup universities.

In 2011, a second tier was added below the Varsity Cup tournament, called the Varsity Shield, which featured the rugby teams of a further five universities.

In 2012, an Under-20 competition was also added, called the Young Guns. Each season, the same eight teams that took part in the Varsity Cup could enter their youth teams in this Young Guns competition. The name "Varsity Rugby" was also coined in 2012 to describe the four competitions collectively.

From the inception of the tournament in 2008 until 2017, the title sponsors of the tournaments were First National Bank and Steinhoff International. For this reason, the competitions were officially known as the "FNB Varsity Cup presented by Steinhoff International", "FNB Varsity Shield presented by Steinhoff International", "FNB Young Guns presented by Steinhoff International" and the "Steinhoff Koshuis Rugby Championships". In 2018, Steinhoff withdrew as a sponsor, with FNB retaining the sponsorship rights.

Player eligibility

The Varsity Rugby competitions implemented rules to help ensure that the majority of the players are bona fide students of the relevant universities. In the 2012 season, Varsity Cup and Varsity Shield sides were required to have 16 full-time students in their 23-man squads. The Young Guns and Res Rugby competitions were restricted to full-time students only. In the 2013 season, Varsity Cup teams were required to have 18 full-time students in their 23-man squads. In addition, students needed to have passed at least 30% of their previous year's courses, and all players, even non-students, must have finished high school. From the 2014 season, Varsity Cup teams were required to have 20 full-time students in their 23-man squads and an entire squad consisting of full-time students were to be fielded from 2015 onwards.

A quota system was also introduced to aid transformation in rugby. Each team had to include a certain number of players of colour in both their matchday squads and starting line-ups (for 2018, eight players of colour had to be included in the matchday squad, with five of those in the starting line-up).

Competition rules

Throughout its history, Varsity Rugby adopted experimental rules during the competitions. Since 2012, a points scoring system was adopted whereby conversions would count three points instead of the traditional two, while penalties and drop goals would count two points instead of the usual three. In 2016, a bonus points system was introduced whereby teams could get two of four bonus points for tries, based on where the try-scoring move originated on the field of play. 2017 saw this rule simplified: if a try is originated from the scoring team's own half, it receives two extra points.

The competition was one of the first to adopt 23-man squads to include two props, which reduced the number of uncontested scrums in matches. They also experimented with having two referees officiating in matches and a white card review system, whereby team captains can refer certain incidents to the television match official.

In addition, each school nominates a "Player That Rocks" each week, who wears pink shorts in his next game. Proceeds from the "Player That Rocks" initiative, along with other fund-raisers, go to a charity nominated by each university that fights domestic violence in their local area.

Teams

The following sides have participated in Varsity Rugby since the competition's inception in 2008:

Varsity Cup

The Varsity Cup is the premier Varsity Rugby competition and is contested on an annual basis between the nine foremost university rugby union teams in South Africa. The competition – known as the "FNB Varsity Cup presented by Steinhoff International" for sponsorship reasons – was first held in 2008.

All eight those teams took part in every season of the competition, with the exception of the TUT Vikings who were relegated to the Varsity Shield competition at the end of the 2012 competition.

Between 2008 and 2016, there were eight teams taking part in the competition; this was expanded to nine teams from 2017 onwards.  returned to the Varsity Cup for 2017, winning promotion from the 2016 Varsity Shield.

Format

The tournament starts with a round robin stage, during which all teams play each other once, either home or away. Teams are awarded four points for a win and two points for a draw. Teams may also be awarded bonus points for either scoring four tries in a game, or for losing a margin by a margin of seven points or less.

At the end of the round robin stage, the top four teams progress to the semi-finals of the play-off stage. In the semi-finals, the team that finishes first has home advantage against the team that finishes fourth, while the team that finishes second has home advantage against the team that finishes third. The semi-final winners progress to the final, played at the venue of the higher-placed team.

Since the introduction of the Varsity Shield tournament in 2011, a promotion/relegation system between the Varsity Cup and Varsity Shield competitions was also introduced. In 2011, the bottom Varsity Cup side played in a play-off match against the Varsity Shield champions. In 2012, promotion/relegation was changed to a bi-annual process occurring in even-numbered years. The bottom team is automatically relegated to the Varsity Shield and replaced by the champions of the Varsity Shield. In addition, the seventh-placed team will take part in a promotion/relegation play-off against the Varsity Shield runner-up. At the end of the 2016 competition, following a decision to expand the competition to nine teams, the bottom team played in the relegation play-off instead.

Teams

The following teams have participated in the Varsity Cup:

Seasons

Varsity Shield

The Varsity Shield is the second-tier Varsity Rugby competition and is contested on an annual basis between the five next-best university rugby union teams in South Africa after the eight Varsity Cup teams. The competition – known as the "FNB Varsity Shield presented by Steinhoff International" for sponsorship reasons – was first held in 2011.

UFH Blues, UKZN Impi and UWC took part in every season of the competition to date, while  played in the Varsity Shield competition since their relegation from the Varsity Cup in 2012.

Format

The tournament starts with a round robin stage, during which all teams play each other twice, once at home and once away. Teams are awarded four points for a win and two points for a draw. Teams may also be awarded bonus points for either scoring four tries in a game, or for losing a margin by a margin of seven points or less.

At the end of the round robin stage, the top two teams progress to the Varsity Shield final, played at the venue of the higher-placed team.

A promotion/relegation system between the Varsity Shield and Varsity Cup competitions was also introduced since the second tier was added to the competition. In 2011, the Varsity Shield champions played in a play-off match against the bottom Varsity Cup side. In 2012, promotion/relegation was changed to a bi-annual process occurring in even-numbered years. The champions of the Varsity Shield is automatically promoted to the Varsity Cup and replaced by the bottom team from the Varsity Cup. In addition, the Varsity Shield runner-up will take part in a promotion/relegation play-off against the seventh-placed team in the Varsity Cup.

Due to an expansion of Varsity Rugby for 2017, the winner of the 2016 Varsity Shield was automatically promoted, while the runner-up played in a promotion play-off against the bottom team in the Varsity Cup. Three additional universities – CPUT, Rhodes University and WSU All Blacks – joined the Varsity Shield for the first time in 2017.

Teams

The following teams have participated in the Varsity Shield:

Seasons

Young Guns

The Varsity Rugby Young Guns competition is a youth competition that forms part of Varsity Rugby and is contested on an annual basis between the Under-20 teams of the eight foremost university rugby union teams in South Africa. The competition – known as the "FNB Young Guns presented by Steinhoff International" for sponsorship reasons – was first held in 2012.

Teams are included or excluded from the competition based on the university's first team's performance in the Varsity Cup competition.

Format

The eight teams are divided into two pools during the group stage. In the first three editions of the competition, teams played the other teams in their pool once, either at home or away, with the top two teams in each pool progressing to the semi-final. In 2015, this was slightly modified so that teams played the teams in the other pool once, either at home or away. This meant each team played in one more match during the pool stage, but led to the semi-finals being scrapped and the top two teams advancing directly to the final.

Teams are awarded four points for a win and two points for a draw. Teams may also be awarded bonus points for either scoring four tries in a game, or for losing a margin by a margin of seven points or less.

Teams

The following teams have participated in the Young Guns competition:

Seasons

Res Rugby

The Res Rugby competition — known as the Koshuis Rugby Championship from 2008 to 2017 — is a competition that forms part of Varsity Rugby and is contested on an annual basis between the winning university residence (koshuis) teams of the nine foremost university rugby union teams in South Africa. The competition was first held in 2008, the same year the first Varsity Cup was also held. The most successful team in the competition to date is University of the Free State koshuis Vishuis, who won the competition on four occasions. The University of the Free State produced the winning koshuis for six competitions, with Huis Armentum, Dagbreek (SU), Heimat also winning the competition.

Teams are included or excluded from the competition based on the university's first team's performance in the Varsity Cup competition.

Format

The eight teams are divided into two pools during the group stage. In the first seven editions of the competition, teams played the other teams in their pool once, either at home or away, with the top two teams in each pool progressing to the semi-final. In 2015, this was slightly modified so that teams played the teams in the other pool once, either at home or away. This meant each team played in one more match during the pool stage, but led to the semi-finals being scrapped and the top two teams advancing directly to the final.

Teams are awarded four points for a win and two points for a draw. Teams may also be awarded bonus points for either scoring four tries in a game, or for losing a margin by a margin of seven points or less.

Teams

The following teams have participated in the play-off stages of the Res Rugby competition:

Seasons

Controversies

The Rugby Transformation Coalition has called for a boycott of the Varsity Cup. This is due to the exclusion of formerly black universities, and the low representation of black players.

Varsity Cup universities has faced accusations of professionalism, and breaking eligibility rules. The punishments handed to guilty teams have also been seen as lenient.

The practice of charging students for tickets, as well as the prices set, have been a point of contention. This led to an SMS campaign against the University of Pretoria.

No private universities have been allowed to compete in the tournament, leading to complaints from Varsity College.

Sponsors

The tournament's current primary sponsors are:
 First National Bank
 Steers

See also

 Varsity Sports
BUCS Super Rugby

References

External links
 

 
University and college rugby union competitions
2008 establishments in South Africa
Student sport in South Africa